Tamazatyube Staroye (Eski Tamaza-Töbe) is a rural locality (a selo) and the administrative centre of Tamazatyubinsky Selsoviet, Babayurtovsky District, Republic of Dagestan, Russia. The population was 403 as of 2010. There are 6 streets.

Geography
Tamazatyube Staroye is located 34 km east of Babayurt (the district's administrative centre) by road. Tsadakh is the nearest rural locality.

References 

Rural localities in Babayurtovsky District